This is a list of films produced in the Telugu cinema (Tollywood) and in the Telugu language.

1930s
 List of Telugu films of the 1930s

1940s
 List of Telugu films of the 1940s
List of Telugu films of 1940
List of Telugu films of 1941
List of Telugu films of 1942
List of Telugu films of 1943
List of Telugu films of 1944
List of Telugu films of 1945
List of Telugu films of 1946
List of Telugu films of 1947
List of Telugu films of 1948
List of Telugu films of 1949

1950s
 List of Telugu films of the 1950s
List of Telugu films of 1950
List of Telugu films of 1951
List of Telugu films of 1952
List of Telugu films of 1953
List of Telugu films of 1954
List of Telugu films of 1955
List of Telugu films of 1956
List of Telugu films of 1957
List of Telugu films of 1958
List of Telugu films of 1959

1960s
 List of Telugu films of the 1960s
List of Telugu films of 1960
List of Telugu films of 1961
List of Telugu films of 1962
List of Telugu films of 1963
List of Telugu films of 1964
List of Telugu films of 1965
List of Telugu films of 1966
List of Telugu films of 1967
List of Telugu films of 1968
List of Telugu films of 1969

1970s
 List of Telugu films of the 1970s
List of Telugu films of 1970
List of Telugu films of 1971
List of Telugu films of 1972
List of Telugu films of 1973
List of Telugu films of 1974
List of Telugu films of 1975
List of Telugu films of 1976
List of Telugu films of 1977
List of Telugu films of 1978
List of Telugu films of 1979

1980s
 List of Telugu films of the 1980s
List of Telugu films of 1980
List of Telugu films of 1981
List of Telugu films of 1982
List of Telugu films of 1983
List of Telugu films of 1984
List of Telugu films of 1985
List of Telugu films of 1986
List of Telugu films of 1987
List of Telugu films of 1988
List of Telugu films of 1989

1990s
 List of Telugu films of the 1990s
List of Telugu films of 1990
List of Telugu films of 1991
List of Telugu films of 1992
List of Telugu films of 1993
List of Telugu films of 1994
List of Telugu films of 1995
List of Telugu films of 1996
List of Telugu films of 1997
List of Telugu films of 1998
List of Telugu films of 1999

2000s
 List of Telugu films of 2000
 List of Telugu films of 2001
 List of Telugu films of 2002
 List of Telugu films of 2003
 List of Telugu films of 2004
 List of Telugu films of 2005
 List of Telugu films of 2006
 List of Telugu films of 2007
 List of Telugu films of 2008
 List of Telugu films of 2009

2010s
 List of Telugu films of 2010
 List of Telugu films of 2011
 List of Telugu films of 2012
 List of Telugu films of 2013
 List of Telugu films of 2014
 List of Telugu films of 2015
 List of Telugu films of 2016
 List of Telugu films of 2017
 List of Telugu films of 2018
 List of Telugu films of 2019

2020s
 List of Telugu films of 2020
 List of Telugu films of 2021
 List of Telugu films of 2022
 List of Telugu films of 2023

References

Lists of Indian films
Lists of films by language